Leobardo Candiani (28 December 1904 – 16 September 1986) was a Mexican fencer. He competed in the individual and team foil events at the 1932 Summer Olympics.

References

External links
 

1904 births
1986 deaths
Mexican male foil fencers
Olympic fencers of Mexico
Fencers at the 1932 Summer Olympics
Sportspeople from Oaxaca
Mexican people of Italian descent
20th-century Mexican people